Muangkrung Football Club (Thai สโมสรฟุตบอลเมืองกรุง), is a Thai football club based in Chonburi, Thailand. The club is currently playing in the 2018 Thailand Amateur League Northern Region.

Record

References

 http://www.nationtv.tv/main/content/sport/378559239/
 https://www.youtube.com/watch?v=vf6aDzp8SkA
 https://www.yak.in.th/tag/%E0%B9%80%E0%B8%A1%E0%B8%B7%E0%B8%AD%E0%B8%87%E0%B8%81%E0%B8%A3%E0%B8%B8%E0%B8%87-%E0%B9%80%E0%B8%AD%E0%B8%9F%E0%B8%8B%E0%B8%B5
 http://www.supersubthailand.com/news/21774-21/index.html#sthash.27SlllcM.dpbs

External links
 Facebookpage

Association football clubs established in 2014
Football clubs in Thailand
Sport in Chonburi province
2014 establishments in Thailand